Charles Joseph "C. J." McLaughlin (born July 1, 1992) is an American professional stock car racing driver who competes part-time in the NASCAR Xfinity Series driving the No. 35 and 53 for Emerling-Gase Motorsports. He has also previously competed in the NASCAR Truck Series and the ARCA Menards Series.

Racing career

McLaughlin tested an ARCA Racing Series car for Hamilton Hughes Racing in early 2016.

In June 2019, McLaughlin finished 23rd in his first NASCAR Gander Outdoors Truck Series race in the M&M's 200 at Iowa Speedway, driving the No. 33 for Reaume Brothers Racing. The following month, he made his NASCAR Xfinity Series debut in the ROXOR 200 at New Hampshire Motor Speedway for RSS Racing. McLaughlin remained with RSS for the 2020 NASCAR Xfinity Series season, running a 20-race schedule with the team.

On April 21, 2021, McLaughlin appeared on a podcast and announced that he would return to Reaume Brothers Racing to compete in five Truck Series races for the team, beginning at Kansas in the No. 34. His schedule also included the race at Charlotte. He also revealed that he would be competing in the Xfinity Series for five races, one of them being New Hampshire, but he did not announce which team he would be driving for. He would end up driving for both MBM Motorsports and Mike Harmon Racing in the Xfinity Series in 2021.

In 2022, McLaughlin returned to RSS Racing to drive part-time for the team in the Xfinity Series in the team's Nos. 38 and 28 cars. He did not run any Truck Series races that year.

On January 30, 2023, it was announced that McLaughlin would run 18 races in either the No. 35 car or No. 53 car for Emerling-Gase Motorsports in the Xfinity Series in 2023. After it was announced on February 2 that team co-owner Joey Gase would drive the No. 53 car at Daytona, it was also revealed that McLaughlin (and Brad Perez and other EGM co-owner Patrick Emerling) would drive the No. 53 with the No. 35 car having one full-time driver.

Personal life
McLaughlin graduated from Wentworth Institute of Technology with a degree in mechanical engineering.

He is not related to former NASCAR driver Mike McLaughlin and his son Max, who has also competed in the Truck and ARCA Series in recent years.

Motorsports career results

NASCAR
(key) (Bold – Pole position awarded by qualifying time. Italics – Pole position earned by points standings or practice time. * – Most laps led.)

Xfinity Series

Camping World Truck Series

 Season still in progress 
 Ineligible for series points

ARCA Menards Series
(key) (Bold – Pole position awarded by qualifying time. Italics – Pole position earned by points standings or practice time. * – Most laps led.)

References

External links
 
 

1992 births
NASCAR drivers
ARCA Menards Series drivers
Living people
Wentworth Institute of Technology alumni
Racing drivers from Massachusetts
Sportspeople from Framingham, Massachusetts